Lazar Arsić (born 24 September 1991) is a professional Serbian footballer who plays for Radnički Niš.

Career 
Born in Belgrade, Arsić began his career in FK Obilić.

On 13 August 2010, he signed for Hungarian club Vasas SC.

After a year and a half he moved to another Hungarian club, Lombard-Pápa TFC.

In summer 2014 he returned to Serbia and joined top-level side FK Radnički 1923. After stints with Cypriot club Apollon Smyrni, and Serbian Radnik Surdulica, Arsić settled in Radnički Niš, where he established himself as one of the top players in the club.

On 9 February 2018, Arsić signed one-and-a-half-year deal with Vojvodina.

On 3 February 2019, Arsić signed one-and-a-half-year deal with Voždovac.

On 9 February 2020, Arsić joined Seoul E-Land FC.

On 20 August 2021, he returned to Radnički Niš.

References

External links
 HLSZ 
 

1991 births
Living people
Footballers from Belgrade
Serbian footballers
Association football midfielders
FK Obilić players
Vasas SC players
Lombard-Pápa TFC footballers
Nemzeti Bajnokság I players
Serbian expatriate footballers
Expatriate footballers in Hungary
Serbian expatriate sportspeople in Hungary
FK Radnički 1923 players
Serbian SuperLiga players
Expatriate footballers in Greece
Serbian expatriate sportspeople in Greece
Apollon Smyrnis F.C. players
FK Radnik Surdulica players
FK Radnički Niš players
Meizhou Hakka F.C. players
China League One players
Expatriate footballers in China
Serbian expatriate sportspeople in China
Seoul E-Land FC players
K League 2 players
Expatriate footballers in South Korea
Serbian expatriate sportspeople in South Korea